The men's freestyle 74 kg is a competition featured at the Golden Grand Prix Ivan Yarygin 2018, and was held in Krasnoyarsk, Russia on the 28 January.

Medalists

Results
Legend
F — Won by fall

Final

Top half
qualification: Zaurbek Sidakov of North Ossetia-Alania def. Nikita Suchkov of Krasnoyarsk (11–6)
qualification: Kakhaber Khubezthy of North Ossetia-Alania def. Magomedkhabib Kadikmagomedov of Dagestan (6-3)

Section 1

Repechage

References

Men's freestyle 74 kg